Nazi Love Camp 27 (Italian: La svastica nel ventre) or The Swastika on the Belly is a 1977 Italian Nazi exploitation film by Italian director Mario Caiano and starring Finnish actress Sirpa Lane. In between brutal depictions of a brothel in a concentration camp and a high-class brothel for leading Nazis, the film partially focuses upon the Lebensborn program and is one of the few Nazisploitation films to contain hardcore pornography.

Plot 
The film opens with young Jewish girl Hanna and her German boyfriend making love in a field in the days before the outbreak of World War II. Upon the outbreak of war, Hanna and her family are rounded up, but not before her mother is killed trying to defend the family. They are taken to a concentration camp, where Hanna's surviving family is gassed upon arrival.

At night, whilst resting in the camp barracks Hanna and a female companion are gang raped by SS soldiers, leading Hanna's friend to throw herself onto an electrified barbed wire fence out of despair. Now alone, Hanna is forced to work in the "love camp" section of the camp, servicing SS soldiers. The commandant soon takes a shine to Hanna, and she becomes his personal lover and they engage in mutual cross-dressing and bondage.

Following he offers Hanna an Aryan identity and she is placed in charge of a brothel for Nazi officers. Meanwhile, her boyfriend who works at a Lebensborn program, tries to search out Hanna, thinking her dead. When they meet, Hanna refuses to be rescued and instead returns to run a party for visiting SS Generals at the brothel. Here, after singing a Yiddish song to the surprise of the guests, she takes revenge, shooting the Commandant and a visiting General, before being gunned down.

Cast
Sirpa Lane as Hannah Meyer
Giancarlo Sisti as Captain Kurt von Stein
Roberto Posse as Captain Klaus Berger
Gianfilippo Carcano as Hanna's Father
Piero Lulli as General at the Nazi Brothel
Marzia Ubaldi as Frau Gruber
Renata Moar as Klaus's Sister
Isabella Russo 
Christiana Borghi as Woman at the love camp (as Cristiana Borghi)
Mike Morris as Herr Gruppenführer

References

External links

1977 films
Italian sexploitation films
1970s Italian-language films
Women in prison films
Nazi exploitation films
Films scored by Francesco De Masi
1970s Italian films